Pethidine, also known as meperidine and sold under the brand name Demerol among others, is a synthetic opioid pain medication of the phenylpiperidine class. Synthesized in 1938 as a potential anticholinergic agent by the German chemist Otto Eisleb, its analgesic properties were first recognized by Otto Schaumann while working for IG Farben, Germany. Pethidine is the prototype of a large family of analgesics including the pethidine 4-phenylpiperidines (piminodine, anileridine and others), the prodines (alphaprodine, MPPP, etc.), bemidones (ketobemidone, etc.) and others more distant, including diphenoxylate and analogues.

Pethidine is indicated for the treatment of moderate to severe pain, and is delivered as a hydrochloride salt in tablets, as a syrup, or by intramuscular, subcutaneous, or intravenous injection. For much of the 20th century, pethidine was the opioid of choice for many physicians; in 1975, 60% of doctors prescribed it for acute pain and 22% for chronic severe pain.

It was patented in 1937 and approved for medical use in 1943. Compared with morphine, pethidine was thought to be safer, carry a lower risk of addiction, and to be superior in treating the pain associated with biliary spasm or renal colic due to its putative anticholinergic effects. These were later discovered to be inaccurate assumptions, as it carries an equal risk of addiction, possesses no advantageous effects on biliary spasm or renal colic compared to other opioids, and due to its toxic metabolite, norpethidine, it is more toxic than other opioids—especially during long-term use. The norpethidine metabolite was found to have serotonergic effects, so pethidine could, unlike most opioids, contribute to serotonin syndrome.

Medical uses
Pethidine is the most widely used opioid in labour and delivery but has fallen out of favour in some countries such as the United States in favour of other opioids, due to its potential drug interactions (especially with serotonergics) and its neurotoxic metabolite, norpethidine. It is still commonly used in the United Kingdom and New Zealand, and was the preferred opioid in the United Kingdom for use during labour, but has been superseded somewhat by diamorphine and other strong semi-synthetic opioids (e.g. hydromorphone) to avoid serotonin interactions since the mid-2000s. Pethidine is the preferred painkiller for diverticulitis, because it decreases intestinal intraluminal pressure. Pethidine is the preferred drug for the management of shivering during therapeutic hypothermia, 
as it provides the greatest reduction in the shivering threshold.

Before 2003 it was on the World Health Organization's List of Essential Medicines, the most effective and safe medicines needed in a health system.

Adverse effects
The adverse effects of pethidine administration are primarily those of the opioids as a class: nausea, vomiting, dizziness, diaphoresis, urinary retention, and constipation. Due to moderate stimulant effects mediated by pethidine's dopamine and norepinephrine reuptake inhibition, sedation is less likely compared to other opioids. Unlike other opioids, it does not cause miosis because of its anticholinergic properties. Overdose can cause muscle flaccidity, respiratory depression, obtundation, psychosis, cold and clammy skin, hypotension, and coma. A narcotic antagonist such as naloxone is indicated to reverse respiratory depression and other effects of pethidine. Serotonin syndrome has occurred in patients receiving concurrent antidepressant therapy with selective serotonin reuptake inhibitors (SSRIs) or monoamine oxidase inhibitors, or other medication types (see Interactions below). Convulsive seizures sometimes observed in patients receiving parenteral pethidine on a chronic basis have been attributed to accumulation in plasma of the metabolite norpethidine (normeperidine). Fatalities have occurred following either oral or intravenous pethidine overdose.

Interactions 

Pethidine has serious interactions that can be dangerous with monoamine oxidase inhibitors (e.g., furazolidone, isocarboxazid, moclobemide, phenelzine, procarbazine, selegiline, tranylcypromine). Such patients may suffer agitation, delirium, headache, convulsions, and/or hyperthermia. Fatal interactions have been reported including the death of Libby Zion. Seizures may develop when tramadol is given intravenously following, or with, pethidine. It can interact as well with SSRIs and other antidepressants, antiparkinson agents, migraine therapy, stimulants and other agents causing serotonin syndrome. It is thought to be caused by an increase in cerebral serotonin concentrations. It is probable that pethidine can also interact with a number of other medications, including muscle relaxants, benzodiazepines, and ethanol.

Mechanism of action

Like morphine, pethidine exerts its analgesic effects by acting as an agonist at the μ-opioid receptor.

Pethidine is often employed in the treatment of postanesthetic shivering. The pharmacologic mechanism of this antishivering effect is not fully understood, but it may involve the stimulation of κ-opioid receptors.

Pethidine has structural similarities to atropine and other tropane alkaloids and may have some of their effects and side effects.  In addition to these opioidergic and anticholinergic effects, it has local anesthetic activity related to its interactions with sodium ion channels.

Pethidine's apparent in vitro efficacy as an antispasmodic agent is due to its local anesthetic effects. It does not have antispasmodic effects in vivo. Pethidine also has stimulant effects mediated by its inhibition of the dopamine transporter (DAT) and norepinephrine transporter (NET). Because of its DAT inhibitory action, pethidine will substitute for cocaine in animals trained to discriminate cocaine from saline.

Several analogs of pethidine such as 4-fluoropethidine have been synthesized that are potent inhibitors of the reuptake of the monoamine neurotransmitters dopamine and norepinephrine via DAT and NET. It has also been associated with cases of serotonin syndrome, suggesting some interaction with serotonergic neurons, but the relationship has not been definitively demonstrated.

It is more lipid-soluble than morphine, resulting in a faster onset of action. Its duration of clinical effect is 120–150 minutes, although it is typically administered at 4– to 6-hour intervals. Pethidine has been shown to be less effective than morphine, diamorphine, or hydromorphone at easing severe pain, or pain associated with movement or coughing.

Like other opioid drugs, pethidine has the potential to cause physical dependence or addiction. The especially severe side effects unique to pethidine among opioids—serotonin syndrome, seizures, delirium, dysphoria, tremor—are primarily or entirely due to the action of its metabolite, norpethidine.

Pharmacokinetics

Pethidine is quickly hydrolysed in the liver to pethidinic acid and is also demethylated to norpethidine, which has half the analgesic activity of pethidine but a longer elimination half-life (8–12 hours); accumulating with regular administration, or in kidney failure. Norpethidine is toxic and has convulsant and hallucinogenic effects. The toxic effects mediated by the metabolites cannot be countered with opioid receptor antagonists such as naloxone or naltrexone, and are probably primarily due to norpethidine's anticholinergic activity probably due to its structural similarity to atropine, though its pharmacology has not been thoroughly explored. The neurotoxicity of pethidine's metabolites is a unique feature of pethidine compared to other opioids. Pethidine's metabolites are further conjugated with glucuronic acid and excreted into the urine.

Recreational use

Trends
In data from the U.S. Drug Abuse Warning Network, mentions of hazardous or harmful use of pethidine declined between 1997 and 2002, in contrast to increases for fentanyl, hydromorphone, morphine, and oxycodone. The number of dosage units of pethidine reported lost or stolen in the U.S. increased 16.2% between 2000 and 2003, from 32,447 to 37,687.

This article uses the terms "hazardous use", "harmful use", and "dependence" in accordance with Lexicon of alcohol and drug terms, published by the World Health Organization (WHO) in 1994. In WHO usage, the first two terms replace the term "abuse" and the third term replaces the term "addiction".

Synthesis
Pethidine can be produced in a two-step synthesis. The first step is reaction of benzyl cyanide and chlormethine in the presence of sodium amide to form a piperidine ring.  The nitrile is then converted to an ester.

Control
Pethidine is in Schedule II of the Controlled Substances Act 1970 of the United States as a Narcotic with ACSCN 9230 with a 6250 kilo aggregate manufacturing quota as of 2014.  The free base conversion ratio for salts includes 0.87 for the hydrochloride and 0.84 for the hydrobromide.  The A, B, and C intermediates in production of pethidine are also controlled, with ACSCN being 9232 for A (with a 6 gram quota) and 9233 being B (quota of 11 grams) and 9234 being C (6 gram quota).  It is listed under the Single Convention for the Control of Narcotic Substances 1961 and is controlled in most countries in the same fashion as is morphine.

Society and culture 
In Raymond Chandler's novel The Long Goodbye (1953), in response to "How is Mrs. Wade?", police Lieutenant Bernie Ohls answers, "Too relaxed. She must have grabbed some pills. There's a dozen kinds up there -- even demerol. That's bad stuff."

Harold Shipman was addicted to pethidine at one stage, convicted of forging prescriptions to obtain it, fined £500 and briefly attended a drug rehabilitation clinic.

Danish writer Tove Ditlevsen suffered a lifelong addiction to pethidine after her husband, a doctor, had injected her with Demerol as a painkiller for an illegal abortion in 1944.

Pethidine is referenced by its brand name Demerol in the song "Morphine" by singer Michael Jackson on his 1997 album Blood on the Dance Floor: HIStory in the Mix. Pethidine was one of several prescription drugs which Michael Jackson was addicted to at the time and the singer describes this in the lyrics of the song with phrases such as "Relax/This won't hurt you" and "Yesterday you had his trust/Today he's taking twice as much".

Pethidine is referenced in the television show Broadchurch, season 2, episode 3, as it was given to the character Beth after she has her baby.

In the 1987 Malayalam movie, Amrutham Gamaya, Mohanlal's character, Dr. P.K. Haridas injects pethidine in himself and gets addicted to it.

A doctor in the TV show Call the Midwife becomes addicted to pethidine.

In William Gibson's book Neuromancer, one of the characters say '"A mixture of cocaine and meperidine, yes." The Armenian went back to the conversation he was having with the Sanyo. "Demerol, they used to call that," said the Finn.'

South Carolina-based modern rock group Crossfade mentions Demerol in the lyrics of their 2004 song, "Dead Skin".

In the episode "The Fight" of the TV show Parks and Recreation, some characters become intoxicated on a mixed drink called Snake Juice. The character Ann (Rashida Jones), who is a nurse, asks, "What the hell is in Snake Juice? Demerol?"

In David Foster Wallace's book Infinite Jest, one of the main characters, Don Gately, is a Demerol addict in recovery.

See also 
 Libby Zion Law (a case involving phenelzine and pethidine)

References 

Analgesics
Convulsants
Ethyl esters
Euphoriants
Glycine receptor antagonists
Kappa-opioid receptor agonists
Local anesthetics
Mu-opioid receptor agonists
Muscarinic antagonists
NMDA receptor antagonists
4-Phenylpiperidines
Serotonin–norepinephrine–dopamine reuptake inhibitors
Sodium channel blockers
Synthetic opioids
German inventions of the Nazi period